The Merv Griffin Show is an American television talk show starring Merv Griffin. The series ran on NBC from October 1, 1962 to March 29, 1963, in first-run syndication from May 10, 1965 to July 4, 1969, at 11:30 PM ET weeknights on CBS from August 18, 1969 to February 11, 1972, and again in first-run syndication from February 14, 1972 to September 5, 1986.

Series history
After a short run as a daytime show on NBC from October 1962 to March 1963, Merv Griffin launched a syndicated version of his talk show produced by Westinghouse (Group W) Broadcasting, which made its debut in May 1965. Intended as a nighttime companion to The Mike Douglas Show and succeeding Steve Allen and Regis Philbin in the time slot, this version of the Griffin program aired in multiple time slots throughout North America (many stations ran it in the daytime, and other non-NBC affiliates broadcast it opposite The Tonight Show Starring Johnny Carson). Stations had the option of carrying either a 60-minute or a 90-minute version. Griffin's announcer-sidekick was the veteran British character actor Arthur Treacher, who had been his mentor. After reading off the list of guests for that evening's show, Treacher would introduce Griffin with the phrase: "...and now, here's the dear boy himself, Meeeer-vyn!"

Seeing his strong ratings, CBS offered him a network series opposite the powerhouse Tonight Show, and his program moved there in the fall of 1969, with his debut guest lineup consisting of Hedy Lamarr, Ted Sorensen, Leslie Uggams, Moms Mabley, and Woody Allen. Although the series did well enough to quickly force the cancellation of another Carson competitor, ABC's The Joey Bishop Show, it was unable to make much of a dent in Carson's ratings. Furthermore, the network was uncomfortable with the guests Griffin wanted, who often spoke out against the Vietnam War and on other taboo topics. When political activist Abbie Hoffman was Griffin's guest in April 1970, CBS blurred the video of Hoffman so viewers at home would not see his trademark American flag pattern shirt, even though other guests had worn the same shirt in the past, uncensored, and Pat Boone appeared in an automobile commercial on that very broadcast wearing a similar flag-motif shirt.

That same year, Griffin relocated his show from New York to Los Angeles, but without sidekick Arthur Treacher, who told him "at my age, I don't want to move, especially to someplace that shakes!". From that point on, Griffin would do the announcing himself, and walk on stage with the phrase: "And now..., here I come!"

However, Griffin's show continued to rank in second place behind Carson, even after the move. By early 1972, sensing that his time at CBS was ending, and tired of the restrictions imposed by the network, Griffin secretly signed a contract with Metromedia and its production arm, Metromedia Producers Corporation (MPC) to continue his program in syndication as soon as CBS canceled Griffin's show. Within a few months, Griffin was fired by CBS. His new show began the following Monday and proved to be more successful than its network counterpart. This version returned Griffin to late-afternoon and late night time slots. Metromedia also gave Griffin prime time clearances on the company's group of independent stations, which included outlets in New York, Los Angeles, Minneapolis–Saint Paul and Washington, D.C. Beginning in 1981, The Merv Griffin Show was cut back to one hour in order to accommodate stations who preferred that length over the 90-minute version.

King World Productions (now CBS Media Ventures) took over syndication of the program in 1984; King World was Griffin's syndication partner for Wheel of Fortune and was about to relaunch his other game show Jeopardy! (Metromedia had briefly syndicated the original Jeopardy! a decade prior and would initially provide the studio for the revival). Metromedia's independent stations continued to carry The Merv Griffin Show until they were sold in early 1986 to News Corporation and 20th Century Fox, who used the stations as the nucleus of the Fox Broadcasting Company. As Fox was already setting up its own late-night talk show, The Late Show Starring Joan Rivers, the former Metromedia stations dropped the show soon thereafter. The show was canceled altogether later that year, and aired its final episode on September 5, 1986.

Overview
Griffin's conversational style created the perfect atmosphere for conducting intelligent interviews that could be serious with some and light-hearted with others. Rather than interview a guest for a cursory 5- or 6-minute segment, Griffin preferred lengthy, in-depth discussions with many stretching out past 30 minutes. In addition, Griffin sometimes dedicated an entire show to a single person or topic, allowing for greater exploration of his guests’ personality and thoughts.

Griffin’s idea of the perfect show was to have as many diverse guests as possible, from entertainers to scientists, Hollywood glamour to Vegas variety, and from comedians to political leaders. A perfect example lies in an episode from September 1965 which featured the zany comedian Phyllis Diller followed by an interview with Capt. Mitsuo Fuchida, the Japanese navy officer who planned and led the attack on Pearl Harbor in 1941— a truly unique moment in television history.

For over a quarter of a century, more than 25,000 guests appeared on The Merv Griffin Show including numerous significant cultural, political, social and musical icons of the 1960s, 1970s and 1980s.  Four U.S. Presidents -- Richard Nixon, Gerald Ford, Jimmy Carter and Ronald Reagan appeared, as did Martin Luther King Jr., Rosa Parks, Jonas Salk and Robert F. Kennedy. Legendary actors and directors who appeared on the program include Orson Welles, John Wayne, Judy Garland (who took over as guest hostess for Griffin on one program in January 1969, six months before her death), Doris Day (Griffin's longtime friend), Robert De Niro, Tom Cruise, Sophia Loren, George Clooney, Tom Hanks, Gene Wilder, Francis Ford Coppola, Dustin Hoffman, Clint Eastwood and Grace Kelly. Musical performers and composers ranging from Devo to Aretha Franklin with Bobby Vinton, Andrew Lloyd Webber, Marvin Gaye, Merle Haggard, The Bee Gees and Johnny Cash, among others, all guesting. The Merv Griffin Show hosted Whitney Houston’s first TV appearance in 1983. Sports figures interviewed by Griffin on the show include Muhammad Ali, Joe Namath, Roger Maris, Willie Mays and Reggie Jackson.  In addition, many of the most important comedians of the era were on the show including early performances by George Carlin, Richard Pryor, Andy Kaufman, Steve Martin, the King of Comedy Jerry Lewis and Jerry Seinfeld, who made his TV debut on the show in 1981. Other notable guests that rarely made TV appearances showed up to talk to Griffin include Maharishi Mahesh Yogi, Andy Warhol, Norman Rockwell and Salvador Dalí.

Griffin's longtime bandleader was Mort Lindsey. Griffin frequently clowned and sang novelty songs with trumpeter Jack Sheldon.

In 2012, Reelin' In the Years Productions started handling all rights to the series on behalf of The Griffin Group. As of February 2014, 1,800 episodes, spanning over 2,000 hours of footage, have been located and preserved for future generations. Episodes of the show have been released on DVDs. Selected edited episodes, distributed by Paul Brownstein Productions, are airing on the GetTV channel.

In popular culture

Seinfeld spoofed the show in Season 9, Episode 6, “The Merv Griffin Show,” in which Cosmo Kramer pretends that he hosts his own talk show using the discarded set from the show, which he sets up in his apartment.

Andy Kaufman's appearance on the show was a feature in the plot of the 1999 biopic Man on the Moon, with Griffin being played by character actor Mike Villani. The movie claims that all guests of the show receive an autographed photo of Griffin, coupons, and Turtle Wax.

The Merv Griffin Show was parodied on Second City Television, with Griffin played by Rick Moranis. The sketches included a crossover with The Andy Griffith Show and a mash-up of 2001: A Space Odyssey and Close Encounters of the Third Kind.

Since making her TV debut on The Merv Griffin Show with the song in June 1983, pop/R&B singer Whitney Houston’s performance of Home has been used heavily in Houston’s discography. The performance made its way onto Whitney: The Greatest Hits DVD (2000), the DVD version of Houston’s 25th anniversary debut album (2010), “We Will Always Love You: A Grammy Salute to Whitney Houston” (2012), Whitney Houston Live: Her Greatest Performances (2014), and the 2018 docu-film  Whitney.  The performance is considered one of Houston’s best and her introduction to the music world.

Awards and nominations

See also 
 List of late night network TV programs

References

External links 
 
 

1962 American television series debuts
1963 American television series endings
1965 American television series debuts
1986 American television series endings
1960s American late-night television series
1970s American late-night television series
1980s American late-night television series
1970s American television series
1980s American television talk shows
American Broadcasting Company original programming
American late-night television shows
Black-and-white American television shows
CBS late-night programming
CBS original programming
Daytime Emmy Award for Outstanding Talk Show winners
English-language television shows
First-run syndicated television programs in the United States
NBC original programming
Television series by Metromedia
Television series by Sony Pictures Television
Television series by King World Productions
Television series by Merv Griffin Enterprises
Television series by Merv Griffin Entertainment
Television shows filmed in Los Angeles
Television shows filmed in New York (state)
Westinghouse Broadcasting